Wong Tsu (also spelled Wong Tsoo, ; 10 August 1893 – 4 March 1965) was a Chinese aeronautical engineer who was the first aeronautical engineer at Boeing.

Life and education 
Wong was born in Beijing, Qing China. At the age of 12, he was selected as a naval cadet; at 16, he was sent to England to study naval engineering, then to the United States to study aeronautical engineering at the Massachusetts Institute of Technology (MIT) during the period of great social and political upheaval in China.

Work 
Wong graduated from MIT with a degree in aeronautical engineering in 1916. He then learned to fly at the Curtiss Flying Boat School in Buffalo, New York. In May 1916, the fledgling Boeing Airplane Company hired Wong as their first trained aeronautical engineer. He helped design the company's first successful product, the Boeing Model C, more than 50 of which the U.S. Navy purchased. In light of the financial windfall brought from the Navy purchases, "from Bill Boeing onward, the company's chief executives through the decades were careful to note that without Wong Tsu's efforts, especially with the Model C, the company might not have survived the early years to become the dominant world aircraft manufacturer." 

Wong brought considerable expertise in wind tunnel testing to Boeing, and advised on the design of the Boeing Aerodynamical Chamber at the University of Washington. In 1917, after around a year at Boeing, he returned to China. In 1928, he became chief secretary of the airline China National Aviation Corporation. From 1934 to 1937, he served as the chief engineer of the Central Aircraft Manufacturing Company, (CAMCO) a joint venture between China and Curtiss-Wright Corporation, Douglas Aviation, and Intercontinent Aviation.

When the Kuomintang government was defeated in the Chinese Civil War, Wong went to Taiwan where he became professor of aviation at National Cheng Kung University. He died on March 4, 1965, in Tainan at the age of 71.

During his lifetime, Wong designed more than two dozen aircraft. In 2004, Boeing unveiled a plaque and exhibit at the Museum of Flight in Seattle, Washington, honoring Wong's work as its first engineer.

See also
 Air Warfare of WWII from the Sino-Japanese War perspective
Aircraft of China both civil and military use from 1937 and before

References

External links 
 Eve Dumovich, "The 1st and the Best"

1893 births
1965 deaths
Chinese aircraft designers
Boeing people
Chinese aviators
MIT School of Engineering alumni
Chinese Civil War refugees
Academic staff of the National Cheng Kung University
Taiwanese people from Beijing
Engineers from Beijing
Chinese expatriates in the United States